Littorio (Italian for lictor) may refer to:

Military
2nd Division "Littorio", infantry division of the Italian Social Republic's Republican National Army
4th Division "Littorio", fully motorized Italian infantry division which participated in the Spanish Civil War
133 Armored Division Littorio, Italian armoured division during World War II
Littorio-class battleship, class of battleship of the Regia Marina, the Italian navy, also known as the Vittorio Veneto class
Italian battleship Littorio, ship of this class which served during World War II

Sporting venues
Littorio Circuit, motor racing circuit around the Littorio airfield, used in the 1930s
Arena Garibaldi – Stadio Romeo Anconetani, stadium in Pisa, Italy, known as Campo Littorio between 1931 and 1949
Stadio Franco Ossola, stadium in Varese, Italy, known as Stadio del Littorio between 1925 and 1950
Stadio Giuseppe Grezar, stadium in Trieste, Italy, known as Stadio Littorio between 1932 and 1943
Stadio Renzo Barbera, stadium in Palermo, Italy, known as Stadio Littorio between 1932 and 1936
Stadio Gino Pistoni, stadium in Ivrea, Italy, known as Stadio Littorio between 1934 and 1945

Other
Littorio Airport, the original name for the Rome-Urbe Airport
Stile Littorio, Italian architectural style, developed during the late Fascist period, inspired by ancient Roman architecture
Villa Littorio, an Italian village and hamlet of Laurino (SA), Campania

See also
Littoria, name of the Italian city of Latina from 1932 to 1946